Bad Dog is an animated series produced by CinéGroupe and Saban Entertainment for the Teletoon and Fox Family Channel networks, first airing on Teletoon on March 1, 1999. The cartoon focused on the Potanski family and their dog Berkeley. The show's gimmick was that, whenever Berkeley was told that he was a bad dog, he would freeze and pretend to be dead until someone told him he was a good dog.

The show was inspired by the After Dark screensaver "Bad Dog". The two dogs have a similar appearance, and the "Bad Dog" of the show is named Berkeley, a likely reference to Berkeley Systems, the creators of After Dark. The show was paired with another series called Monster Farm.

Internationally, the series did air on Fox Kids (later known as Jetix), being lastly rerun in 2011 on Disney Channel in Netherlands.

Characters
 Berkeley aka "Barky": The not-so-normal dog owned by the Potanski family who likes having adventures and always gets everyone into trouble. He appears to have a compulsion to obey every order he hears, including those that were not given to him. As a running gag, he passes out when he hears Bad Dog and wakes up when he hears Good Dog.
 "Little Vic" Potanski: The younger Potanski son. He loves Berkeley extremely.
 Penelope Potanski: The sole Potanski daughter. She likes her beauty, and also seems to have something of a penchant for the theatre.
 Trevor Potanski: The easily  panicked genius older son with a like of playing chess. He wears glasses. He also has a large amount of allergies and phobias.
 Mr. and Mrs. Potanski: The parents of Vic, Penelope, and Trevor and the owners of Berkeley. Mr. Potanski is an inventor who owns a business called "Potanski's Top Of The Line", however all of his inventions backfire with disastrous results. Mrs. Potanski is a psychiatrist whose office is located in her house.
 Grandfather Potanski: The eldest Potanski. Once an astronaut, he likes watching space-related programs on TV and often mistakes everyone's name.
 Lester Johnson: Neighbor of the Potanskis who loves his cat named Special, but hates Berkeley and often calls him "The Beast Dog".
 Special: Lester Johnson's cat, who usually doesn't move and frequently sought out by Berkeley.
 Mrs. Simpkins: A frequent patient of Mrs. Potanski, who has a phobia of practically everything; her main phobia, however, appears to be of dogs.

Voices
Harvey Atkin as Mr. Potanski
Sheila McCarthy as Mrs. Potanski
John Stocker as Grandpa Potanski
Emilie-Claire Barlow as Penelope Potanski/Priscilla the Supermodel
Tracey Moore as Vic Potanski
Robert Smith as Trevor Potanski
James Rankin
Ron Rubin
Richard Binsley as The-Rat-Away-3000
Don Francks
Philip Williams as Barry Little
Michael Hall as Professor Peerless

Episodes

Season 1
 1. Disobedience School Part 1 / Disobedience School Part 2
 The Potanski family must figure out why their dog, Berkeley, is acting weird / Mrs. Eva hypnotizes Berkeley to be a normal dog, not the crazy dog.
 2. Beast Of Show / Trouble With Toto
 Berkeley joins Lester and Special in travel for the cat show / Penelope tries to get rid of Berkeley from the school performance about the Wizard of Oz.
 3. Take Me Out Of The Ballgame / Potanskis Go Hollywood
 Mr. Potanski decides to put Berkeley, Trevor, Penelope and Trevor's friends into a baseball team / Mr. Potanski decides to put his family into a commercial.
 4. Space Dog / Robo-Dog
 Berkeley and Grandfather Potanski accidentally go into outer space / The Potanski Family order a robot dog named Happyway 3000.
 5. Berkeley Takes The Cake / Neighborhood Botch
 Penelope tries to hide her birthday cake from Berkeley / Berkeley stops two criminals from robbing the houses and kidnapping Special.
 6. The Mild Bunch / Berkeley Smells A Rat
 Mr. Potanski takes Berkeley, Vic, Trevor and Trevor's friends as the scouts to the forest / Berkeley feels a rat inside the house.
 7. Buckaroo Berkeley / Real Incredible Genius Dog
 Mr. Potanski wishes to ride on the bull called Jack Mallet / The Potanski family take Berkeley into a competition The Animal Geniuses.
 8. Big Inflatable Dog / Berkeley Speaks Out
 Barry, Harry and Larry Vickers, who are the mayors of the three towns called Pleasantville, win the platform competition / Trevor creates the Trevortron 1000 for the science contest.
 9. Bad Dad / They Came, They Saw, They Meowed
 Mr. Potanski becomes totally angry at Berkeley for making troubles at Vic's birthday / Berkeley takes a spacecat named Woods, who's the commander of the cat invasion, to Vic.
 10. Sick Puppy / Bad Dog To The Bone
 Mrs. Potanski hypnotizes Berkeley to don't be afraid of the vet / It's revealed the house of Potanskis is above the underground temple of the golden mole.
 11. The Flying Potanskis / Burden Of Woof
 Penelope is excited to be a star of the circus, like Betty Bolinda / Mr. Johnson wants to get Berkeley to the jail for abducting Special.
 12. A Dog For All Sneezens / If Bad Dog Had A Hammer
 Berkeley and Trevor have an allergy for dog shampoo, but it can be solved / Berkeley, Vic, Mr. Potanski and Trevor renovate Mrs. Potanski's room and instead they blow up the house.
 13. Love Dog / Bad Dog Ate My Homework
 Grandfather Potanski misses his girlfriend / Berkeley tries to eat Penelope's science experiment.
 14. Dogs Are People Too / Fire Dog
 Berkeley is once again hypnotized to be a normal dog / Berkeley, Mr. Potanski and Trevor become fire guards.
 15. It's A Zoo In Here / A Cat Of A Different Color
 Berkeley meets a depressed monkey / Berkeley and Vic decide to play with Special and Catsanova.
 16. Til Dog Do Us Part / Psycho Dog
 Mrs. Simpkins and Walter get married / Mr. Johnson loses his voice.
 17. Celebrity Spokesdog / Jurassic Bark
 Berkeley becomes famous at the dog cookies commercial / Berkeley and Vic want to see the Spodoraptors.
 18. Bad Dog Overboard / Dr. Bad Dog's 2½ Day Diet
 Berkeley, Vic, Mr. Potanski, Trevor and Grandfather Potanski go for a fishing competition / Berkeley tries to put Mr. Potanski into a diet.
 19. Super Bad Dog / A Man's Best Fred
 Berkeley becomes a superhero / Trevor becomes obsessed with a robot called Fred
 20. If I Were A Bad Dog / Bad Night At The Opera
 Sally decides to change the roles of the Potanski family. / Berkeley joins his owners at the opera.
 21. Bad Dog Imitates Art / No Bad Dogs Allowed
 Berkeley and Vic help Penelope for creating the portrait for art contest / After Berkeley becomes dirty, he's taken to the dog hairdresser for a bath.
 22. Bad Therapy / Police Dog
 Berkeley, Vic, Mrs. Potanski and Grandfather Potanski help the elder people to be happy. / Berkeley becomes a policeman.
 23. Bad Connection / Prison Dog
 Berkeley creates a tunnel what leads from his dog house to Mr. Johnson's house. / Berkeley helps two candy criminals escape from prison
 24. Barky's Arky / Nightmare on Berkeley's Street
 Berkeley takes the animals for the Ark / Grandfather Potanski is having the nightmares
 25. 101 Berkeleys / The Isle Of Bad Dog   
 Trevor accidentally makes 101 Berkeleys and becomes scared for ruining the house, but it turns out to be a dream / Berkeley is mistaken for being a Jelekreb
 26. Smiley Says ... Bad Dog / No Cure For A Bad Dog
 Berkeley and Vic want to be the stars of Smiley's show. / Mr. Potanski caught the hiccups after drinking the coke.

Season 2 (2000)
Teletoon air dates in parentheses:

 27. Badseat Driver / International Genius Dog
 The Potanski family buys a new car / Berkeley once again goes to a competition the Genius animal
 28. Bad Dog's Incredible Journey / Nurse Barky
 On the way to the amusement park, Berkeley is left behind at the dog pound. Berkeley runs away and, while on his way to the amusement park, Berkeley stops the criminals and saves the life of a little kid. / Penelope fakes illness to get away from school.
 29. One Bad Apple / Beauty and the Beast Dog
 Berkeley goes into a kindergarten / Trevor seeks Berkeley's help in getting away from a crazy girl
 30. Booty for Bad Dog / Dog Breath
 Berkeley goes underwater, looking for treasure. / Berkeley's breath becomes stinky.
 31. Safari Dog / Magic Dog
 The Potanski family goes into safari park. / The Potanski family sees a show of a magician, Mr. Poteyton, but Berkeley reveals these all tricks are fake
 32. Ye Olde Bad Dog / Bad Dogs and Englishmen
 The Potanski family goes into a knight fair / Berkeley is taken away by the English family.
 33. Dog-Napped / Bad Dog-Eared
 Berkeley is abducted by two criminals. / Berkeley begins unhear all
 34. Counting Sheep Dogs / Beauty Dog
 Mr. Potanski is attacked by the unsleep. / Berkeley goes into a pageant
 35. Wag the Bad Dog / Dog House Arrest
 Berkeley joins his owners at the trip at Washington / Berkeley is grounded from going outside
 36. Ding, Dong, Bad Dog Calling / Guard Dog
 Berkeley and Vic try to give Mr. Johnson the chocolate bars. / Berkeley teaches himself from the TV how to be the guard dog.
 37. A Super Bad Hair Day / Animal Magnetism
 Berkeley makes the problems for a model / Berkeley eats a magnet.
 38. Earth Dog / Good Lovin' Gone Bad Dog
 At the Earth days, Mr. Potanski, Trevor and Grandfather Potanski try to get rid of this, but are stopped by Berkeley and Penelope. / Berkeley and Mrs. Simpkins are hypnotized for a love
 39. A Very Berkeley Christmas / Doggy Detective
 Vic wants to have Santa Claus as his Christmas gift / Berkeley investigates the thieves
 40. Bad Blood is Thicker Than Water / They Came, They Saw, They Purred
 Berkeley is reunited with his family. / The assistants of Woods try to get their leader back to their team.

References

External links
 

1990s American animated television series
2000s American animated television series
1998 American television series debuts
2000 American television series endings
1990s Canadian animated television series
2000s Canadian animated television series
1998 Canadian television series debuts
2000 Canadian television series endings
American children's animated comedy television series
Canadian children's animated comedy television series
Animated television series about dogs
Animated television series about dysfunctional families
Television shows filmed in Montreal
Fox Kids
Television series by Saban Entertainment
Teletoon original programming
English-language television shows